In Greek mythology, Peteus or Peteos (Ancient Greek: Πετεώς or Πετεώο) or Petes (Πέτην) was a member of the Athenian royal family as the son of Orneus, son of King Erechtheus.  In some versions of the myth, Petes was originally an Egyptian, who later obtained Athenian citizenship.

Family 
By Polyxene or Mnesimache, Peteos became the father of Menestheus, successor of Theseus.

Mythology 
Peteus migrated from Attica to Phocis after he was pursued by King Aegeus. The majority of his companions came from deme of Stiria. Later on, to spite Theseus, the Dioscuri brought back his son Menestheus from exile, and made him regent of Athens.

Notes

References 

 Diodorus Siculus, The Library of History translated by Charles Henry Oldfather. Twelve volumes. Loeb Classical Library. Cambridge, Massachusetts: Harvard University Press; London: William Heinemann, Ltd. 1989. Vol. 3. Books 4.59–8. Online version at Bill Thayer's Web Site
Diodorus Siculus, Bibliotheca Historica. Vol 1-2. Immanel Bekker. Ludwig Dindorf. Friedrich Vogel. in aedibus B. G. Teubneri. Leipzig. 1888–1890. Greek text available at the Perseus Digital Library.
Graves, Robert, The Greek Myths: The Complete and Definitive Edition. Penguin Books Limited. 2017. 
Lucius Mestrius Plutarchus, Lives with an English Translation by Bernadotte Perrin. Cambridge, MA. Harvard University Press. London. William Heinemann Ltd. 1914. 1. Online version at the Perseus Digital Library. Greek text available from the same website.
 Pausanias, Description of Greece with an English Translation by W.H.S. Jones, Litt.D., and H.A. Ormerod, M.A., in 4 Volumes. Cambridge, MA, Harvard University Press; London, William Heinemann Ltd. 1918. . Online version at the Perseus Digital Library
 Pausanias, Graeciae Descriptio. 3 vols. Leipzig, Teubner. 1903. Greek text available at the Perseus Digital Library.
 Stephanus of Byzantium, Stephani Byzantii Ethnicorum quae supersunt, edited by August Meineike (1790-1870), published 1849. A few entries from this important ancient handbook of place names have been translated by Brady Kiesling. Online version at the Topos Text Project.

Attican characters in Greek mythology